NA-230 Karachi Malir-I is a constituency for the National Assembly of Pakistan.

Members of Parliament

2018-2022: NA-236 Karachi Malir-I

Election 2002 

General elections were held on 10 Oct 2002. Sher Muhammad Baloch of Pakistan Peoples Party won by 38,225 votes.

Election 2008 

General elections were held on 18 Feb 2008. Sher Muhammad Baloch of PPP won by 134,696 votes.

Election 2013 

General elections were held on 11 May 2013. Abdul Hakeem Baloch of PML-N won by 52,751 votes and became the member of National Assembly.

Bye Election 2016 
On Nov 28, 2016 bye elections were held.  Abdul Hakeem Baloch (who resigned from PML-N and joined Pakistan Peoples Party - PPP after developing differences with the PML-N leadership) won by 72400 votes on PPP ticket.

Election 2018 

General elections were held on 25 July 2018.

See also
NA-229 Dadu-II
NA-231 Karachi Malir-II

References

External links 
Election result's official website

NA-258
Karachi